The University of the State of New York (USNY) (distinct from the State University of New York, known as SUNY), its policy-setting Board of Regents, and its administrative arm, the New York State Education Department, oversee all public primary, middle-level, and secondary education in the state. The New York City Department of Education, which manages the public school system in New York City, is the largest school district in the United States, with more students than the combined population of eight U.S. states. Over 1 million students are taught in more than 1,200 separate schools.

Primary and secondary schools

Public secondary education consists of high schools that teach elective courses in trades, languages, and liberal arts with tracks for gifted, college-bound and industrial arts students. New York is one of seven states that mandate the teaching of Holocaust and genocide studies at some point in elementary or secondary school curricula.

One of the major public policy issues in recent decades has been the attempt by poorer communities to get more state funding to compensate for what they cannot generate in property taxes. The reliance of most communities on local property taxes to support schools has created the paradoxical situation of residents in wealthier communities paying a lower tax rate than residents in communities of lower average income.

While state law has required integrated schools since 1900 (overturning an 1894 law that permitted communities to establish separate schools for children of African-American descent), patterns of residential segregation in many areas has often led to de facto segregated schools. As studies have shown the importance of integrating children from different economic classes, more than ethnic groups, communities are devising different methods, such as magnet schools, to deal with attracting diverse groups of students.

Charter schools

, there were 183 charter schools serving 70,000 students in the state.

History
Between 2000 and 2009, school enrollment declined by 121,000 students, and the number of teachers increased by 15,000. The student:teacher ratio was the eighth lowest in the country, 13:1. At $16,000, its per student spending was the nation's highest.

Colleges and universities

The SUNY System
 New York's statewide public university system is the State University of New York (SUNY), which includes top-ranked schools such as University at Albany, Binghamton University, University at Buffalo, and Stony Brook University.
With a total enrollment of 459,550 students and 1.1 million continuing education students spanning 64 campuses across the state, SUNY is the largest comprehensive public university system in the United States. New York's largest public university is the State University of New York at Buffalo, which was founded by U.S President and Vice President Millard Fillmore. The campuses are a mix of community colleges, technical colleges, undergraduate colleges, and doctoral-granting institutions, with the latter including the four university centers (University at Albany, Binghamton University, University at Buffalo, and Stony Brook University).

The SUNY system includes the following campuses, broken down into the categories of University Centers, other doctoral-granting institutions including five statutory institutions, Comprehensive Colleges, Technology Colleges, and Community Colleges.

Doctoral-Granting Institutions
University Centers
University at Albany
Binghamton University
University at Buffalo (SUNY Buffalo)
Stony Brook University

Other doctoral-granting institutions and statutory colleges

State University of New York College of Environmental Science and Forestry (next to the private Syracuse University campus, with which it has a close working relationship, but which is legally and technically not a part of)
SUNY College of Optometry
SUNY Downstate Medical Center
SUNY Polytechnic Institute
SUNY Upstate Medical University

One statutory college at Alfred University:
New York State College of Ceramics (which is legally and technically part of Alfred University)

Four statutory colleges at Cornell University (which are legally and technically part of Cornell):
New York State College of Agriculture and Life Sciences (CALS)
includes the New York State Agricultural Experiment Station at Geneva, New York
New York State College of Human Ecology (HumEc)
New York State School of Industrial and Labor Relations (ILR)
New York State College of Veterinary Medicine

Comprehensive Colleges
Buffalo State College
State University of New York College at Cortland
Empire State College (statewide)
State University of New York at Purchase
State University of New York at Geneseo
State University of New York at Oneonta
State University of New York at Fredonia
State University of New York at New Paltz
State University of New York at Oswego
State University of New York at Potsdam
State University of New York at Plattsburgh
State University of New York at Old Westbury
State University of New York at Brockport

Technology Colleges
Alfred State College
State University of New York at Canton
State University of New York at Cobleskill
State University of New York at Delhi
Farmingdale State College
State University of New York Maritime College
Morrisville State College
Fashion Institute of Technology

Community Colleges
SUNY Adirondack Community College
Broome Community College
Cayuga Community College
Clinton Community College
Columbia-Greene Community College
Corning Community College
Dutchess Community College
Erie Community College
Finger Lakes Community College
Fulton-Montgomery Community College
Genesee Community College
Herkimer County Community College
Hudson Valley Community College
Jamestown Community College
Jefferson Community College
Mohawk Valley Community College
Monroe Community College
Nassau Community College
Niagara County Community College
North Country Community College
Onondaga Community College
Orange County Community College (SUNY Orange)
Rockland Community College
Schenectady County Community College
Suffolk County Community College
Sullivan County Community College
Tompkins Cortland Community College
Ulster County Community College
Westchester Community College

The CUNY System
The City University of New York (CUNY) is the public university system of New York City and is independent of the SUNY system. It is the largest urban university in the United States, with 11 senior colleges, an honors college, 7 community colleges, a doctorate-granting graduate school, a journalism school, a law school, the CUNY School of Medicine, a professional studies school, and a public health school. More than 274,000 degree-credit, adult, continuing and professional education students are enrolled at campuses located in all five New York City boroughs.

CUNY consists of the following 24 colleges, including the senior colleges, community colleges, graduate and professional institutions.

Senior Colleges
Baruch College
Brooklyn College
City College of New York
College of Staten Island
Hunter College
John Jay College of Criminal Justice
Lehman College
Medgar Evers College
New York City College of Technology
Queens College, City University of New York
York College, City University of New York

Community Colleges
Borough of Manhattan Community College
Bronx Community College
Guttman Community College
Hostos Community College
Kingsborough Community College
LaGuardia Community College
Queensborough Community College

Graduate and professional schools
CUNY Graduate Center
CUNY Graduate School of Journalism
CUNY School of Law
CUNY School of Medicine
CUNY School of Professional Studies
CUNY School of Public Health
William E. Macaulay Honors College

Private universities

New York has hundreds of private colleges and universities, including many religious and special-purpose institutions. The state's land-grant university is Cornell University; though primarily a private institution, it has public sectors. Columbia University, Cornell University, New York University, and the University of Rochester are widely regarded as the premier higher education institutions in New York, all of them leading, world-renowned universities and members of the Association of American Universities, the pre-eminent group of research universities in the United States.

Two of the nation's five Federal Service Academies are located in New York:  the United States Military Academy at West Point and the United States Merchant Marine Academy at Kings Point.

New York attracts the most college students from other states, according to statistics that show that among freshmen who leave their home states to attend college, more come to New York than any other state, including California.

In total, New York State has 307 degree-granting institutions, second in number only to California. Among the most notable and highest ranked institutions are:

See also

Government of New York
Education in New York City
List of colleges and universities in New York

References

 
New York State Education Department